Andrew Lorimar Lochhead (9 March 1941 – 18 March 2022) was a Scottish professional footballer who played as a forward.

Career
Lochhead was born in Milngavie, Stirlingshire, Scotland. He started his career at Burnley and made his first team debut in 1960. He remains the only player to have scored five goals for the Clarets on two occasions. On 26 December 1963, he scored four goals in a 6–1 win over Manchester United at Turf Moor.

In 1968, he was sold to Leicester City and appeared in their 1969 FA Cup Final 1–0 defeat against Manchester City.

He was sold to Aston Villa after the final and played in the 1971 Football League Cup Final for Villa. In 1972 following his contribution to the Villa's promotion to Division 2 (19 goals) he was voted the midlands footballer of the year in a write-in poll conducted by the Birmingham Evening Mail newspaper. In 1973, he was sold to Oldham Athletic. He had a brief spell in America with Denver Dynamos before retiring.

Honours

As a player
Leicester City
 FA Cup finalist: 1969

Aston Villa
 League Cup finalist: 1971
 Division 3: 1971–72

Oldham Athletic 
 Division 3: 1973-74

References

 
 

1941 births
2022 deaths
People from Milngavie
Scottish footballers
Association football forwards
Scotland under-23 international footballers
FA Cup Final players
English Football League players
North American Soccer League (1968–1984) players
Burnley F.C. players
Leicester City F.C. players
Aston Villa F.C. players
Oldham Athletic A.F.C. players
Denver Dynamos players
Scottish expatriate sportspeople in the United States
Expatriate soccer players in the United States
Scottish expatriate footballers